A list of American films released in 1952.
The Greatest Show on Earth won the Academy Award for Best Picture.

A-B

C-G

H-J

K-N

O-R

S-Z

Serials

Shorts and documentaries

See also
 1952 in the United States

References

External links

1952 films at the Internet Movie Database

1952
Films
Lists of 1952 films by country or language